Antonio García Padilla (born 1954 in Ponce, Puerto Rico) is a Puerto Rican scholar. He served as the president of University of Puerto Rico from 2001 to 2009.

Personal life

Garcia Padilla was born in Ponce and raised in  the nearby town of Coamo. He had five brothers, among them Alejandro, former senator and Governor of Puerto Rico, and Juan Carlos, current mayor of Coamo, Puerto Rico.

Training
García Padilla received his undergraduate degree in 1974 and his law degree in 1978 from the University of Puerto Rico and an LL.M. from Yale Law School in 1981. He has served as law clerk first to the Supreme Court of Puerto Rico and then on the United States Court of Appeals for the First Circuit. He was then Assistant Professor at the University of Puerto Rico School of Law, later serving as Associate Dean of the Law School in 1983 and Dean in 1986. In 1999, he was elected to the Council of The American Law Institute.

President
He served as president of the University of Puerto Rico. He assumed the presidency on 25 November 2001, and resigned on 30 September 2009.

See also
 University of Puerto Rico

References

|-

Presidents of the University of Puerto Rico
Educators from Ponce
Living people
1954 births
Puerto Rican academics
University of Puerto Rico alumni
Members of the American Law Institute